David Lane Powers (July 29, 1896 – March 28, 1968) was an American Republican Party politician who represented  in the United States House of Representatives from 1933 to 1945.

Early life and career
Born in Philadelphia, Pennsylvania, Powers attended the public schools, and was graduated from Pennsylvania Military College at Chester, Pennsylvania in 1915. During World War I, he was commissioned a second lieutenant on August 15, 1917. He was promoted to first lieutenant and served as battalion adjutant in the Eight Hundred and Seventh Pioneer Infantry. He moved to Trenton, in 1919 and engaged in the building business. He served as member of the New Jersey General Assembly from 1928 to 1930.

Congress
Powers was elected as a Republican to the Seventy-third and to the six succeeding Congresses and served from March 4, 1933, until his resignation on August 30, 1945, to become a member of the New Jersey Public Utilities Commission, a post he held until retirement in 1967.

Death
He died in Feasterville, Pennsylvania, March 28, 1968, and was interred in Riverview Cemetery, Trenton, New Jersey.

External links

 David Lane Powers at The Political Graveyard
 

1896 births
1968 deaths
Politicians from Philadelphia
Republican Party members of the New Jersey General Assembly
Politicians from Trenton, New Jersey
Widener University alumni
United States Army officers
United States Army personnel of World War I
Burials in New Jersey
Republican Party members of the United States House of Representatives from New Jersey
20th-century American politicians
Military personnel from New Jersey